Carel S. Scholten (Amsterdam, 1925 – 2009) was a physicist and a pioneer of computing.

He went to the Vossius Gymnasium in Amsterdam and then studied physics from 1945 to 1952 at the University of Amsterdam.

In 1947 he was asked by the Dutch Mathematisch Centrum (which later became the Centrum Wiskunde & Informatica) to collaborate in building an automatic calculator with his friend and fellow student Bram Loopstra. Their first system, the ARRA I was not a success, but its successor, the ARRA II, on which Gerrit Blaauw also collaborated, was.

In 1954 work started on the ARMAC, which he built together with Loopstra and Edsger W. Dijkstra, who was responsible for the software and collaborated with Scholten for more than 30 years.
The ARMAC was remarkable for its use of transistors.

In 1958 Scholten went to work for Electrologica (later Philips Electrologica), where he developed the Electrologica X1 computer with Loopstra; up to 1964, 40 models were installed, mainly at universities. He remained with Philips Electrologica until 1979, when he switched to the Philips Natuurkundig Laboratorium, where he stayed until 1985.

In 1991 he was awarded an honorary doctorate by Technische Universiteit Eindhoven.

Publications 
 Edsger W. Dijkstra and Carel S. Scholten (1990). Predicate Calculus and Program Semantics. Springer-Verlag  – An abstract, formal treatment of Predicate transformer semantics

External links
 Eredoctor  Carel Scholten overleden - TU Eindhoven(in Dutch) – Obituary by the TU Eindhoven.
 Unsung Heroes in Dutch Computing History – Carel S. Scholten and Bram Jan Loopstra – Illustrated report of his work at the TU Eindhoven.
 Computers ontwerpen, toen (Designing computers, back then) (in Dutch, on the Electrologica Foundation site) – Retrospective address by Carel Scholten on 23-11-1979.

References

1925 births
2009 deaths
20th-century Dutch physicists
Scientists from Amsterdam
Philips employees
University of Amsterdam alumni